Horst-Herzhorn is an Amt (collective municipality) in the district of Steinburg, in Schleswig-Holstein, Germany. The seat of the Amt is in Horst. Before 1 January 2008, when it was merged with the Amt Herzhorn, it was named Amt Horst.

The Amt Horst-Herzhorn consists of the following municipalities:
Altenmoor 
Blomesche Wildnis 
Borsfleth 
Engelbrechtsche Wildnis 
Herzhorn
Hohenfelde 
Horst
Kiebitzreihe 
Kollmar 
Krempdorf 
Neuendorf bei Elmshorn 
Sommerland

Ämter in Schleswig-Holstein